Caudry is a railway station located in the commune of Caudry in the Nord department, France. The station is served by TER Hauts-de-France trains (Lille-Flandres - Saint-Quentin line).

Caudry was formerly connected by secondary lines with Saint-Quentin via Le Catelet, Cambrai, Denain via Quiévy and Saint-Aubert and Catillon via Le Quesnoy. It was part of the metre gauge system of the Chemin de fer du Cambrésis.

See also

List of SNCF stations in Hauts-de-France

References

Railway stations in Nord (French department)
Railway stations in France opened in 1858